Nickoletta "Nikki" Flannery (born 22 February 1999) is an Australian football player, who currently plays for W-League club Canberra United.

References

External links 
 
 

1999 births
Living people
Australian women's soccer players
Women's association football midfielders
Canberra United FC players
A-League Women players
Newcastle Jets FC (A-League Women) players